Patrick “Pat” Dillett is a 4 x Grammy winning New York based record producer, mixer & sound engineer.  He is known for his working relationships with David Byrne, Nile Rodgers, and Thomas Bartlett a/k/a Doveman.  He has worked with notable artists including They Might Be Giants, Sufjan Stevens, Rhye, Angelique Kidjo, The Gloaming, Glen Hansard, Chris Thile, Laurie Anderson, Marisa Monte, St. Vincent, Caetano Veloso & The National, as well as successful pop and R&B singers Mary J. Blige and Mariah Carey.

Production discography

Marvin Pontiac, The Asylum Tapes
Steely Dan, Northeast Corridor
David Byrne American Utopia (co-produced with David Byrne and Rodaidh McDonald)
Angelique Kidjo Eve
Julia Stone, By the Horns
David Byrne & St. Vincent, Love This Giant (co-produced & mixed with David Byrne, Annie Clark and John Congleton)
Doveman The Conformist
Tegan and Sara, Alligator (remix)
Lounge Lizards Queen of All Ears (co-produced with John Lurie)
David Byrne Grown Backwards (co-produced with David Byrne)
Doveman Acrobat (co-produced with Dougie Bowne)
They Might Be Giants, every album since Factory Showroom
Joe Jackson, Fool

Mix discography

St. Vincent, MassEducation
Owen Pallett, Island
Haux, Violence in a Quiet Mind
Chris Thile, Thanks for Listening
Kishi Bashi, Omoiyari
Norah Jones, Begin Again
Rhye, Woman
Sufjan Stevens, Carrie & Lowell
Oh Land, Family Tree
Matthew E. White , Fresh Blood
Blonde Redhead, 3 O'Clock
The Gloaming, The Gloaming
Anna Calvi, Strange Weather
They Might Be Giants, I Like Fun
Glen Hansard, Rhythm and Repose
Trixie Whitley, Fourth Corner
Dawn Landes, Bluebird
Julia Stone, By the Horns
Donald Fagen, Sunken Condos
The National, High Violet
David Byrne & Brian Eno, Everything That Happens Will Happen Today
My Brightest Diamond, All Things Will Unwind
Charli Adams, Good at Being Young
Marisa Monte, O Que Voce Ser Saber de Verdade
Bebel Gilberto, Cancao de Amor
Marisa Monte, Memories Chronicles and Declarations of Love
Caetano Veloso, Circulado
Ryuichi Sakamoto, Heartbeat
Mary J. Blige, "Growing Pains"
Queen Latifah, Black Reign
Mariah Carey, Mariah Carey
Aaliyah, One in a Million
Arto Lindsay, Prize

Recording and engineering discography
St. Vincent, "MassEducation"
Laurie Anderson, "Homeland"
Chic, "Chic Mystique"
The Notorious B.I.G., "Duets The Final Chapter"
Mary J. Blige, "Love and Life"
Diana Ross, "Working Overtime"

Soundtrack and film discography
A Portrait of Marina Abramovic, a film by Matthu Placek
Dark Was the Night, "Red Hot DVD"
Maid in Manhattan
Get Shorty

References

External links
Facebook
Twitter

Year of birth missing (living people)
Living people
American audio engineers
American record producers
Place of birth missing (living people)